Baystone was a racing horse and the winner of the 1958 Melbourne Cup with jockeys Mel Schumacher, J. Thompson, and F. Treen and trainers Jack Green, F. Dalton and O.N. Marshall. His winning time was 3:21:25 and his odds were ten to one. He finished the race one and a half lengths in front of the next racer, Monte Carlo. Baystone was the first horse in Cup history winning with the number 7 saddlecloth. The 1958 Melbourne Cup was the first one with automatic barrier stalls.

Baystone was favored 10/1 partly due to the victory he claimed the Saturday before the race at the Hotham Handicap.

References 

Melbourne Cup winners
Australian racehorses 
Racehorses bred in Australia 
Racehorses trained in Australia 
1952 racehorse births